Main-Kinzig – Wetterau II – Schotten is an electoral constituency (German: Wahlkreis) represented in the Bundestag. It elects one member via first-past-the-post voting. Under the current constituency numbering system, it is designated as constituency 175. It is located in eastern Hesse, comprising eastern and central parts of Main-Kinzig-Kreis, the eastern part of Wetteraukreis district, and the municipality of Schotten from Vogelsbergkreis.

Main-Kinzig – Wetterau II – Schotten was created for the 2013 federal election. Since 2021, it has been represented by Bettina Müller of the Social Democratic Party (SPD).

Geography
Main-Kinzig – Wetterau II – Schotten is located in eastern Hesse. As of the 2021 federal election, it comprises the entirety of the Main-Kinzig-Kreis district excluding the municipalities of Bruchköbel, Erlensee, Großkrotzenburg, Hammersbach, Hanau, Hasselroth, Langenselbold, Maintal, Neuberg, Nidderau, Niederdorfelden, Rodenbach, Ronneburg, and Schöneck, as well as the municipalities of Altenstadt, Büdingen, Gedern, Glauburg, Hirzenhain, Kefenrod, Limeshain, and Ortenberg from the Wetteraukreis district, and the municipality of Schotten from the Vogelsbergkreis district.

History
The 2013 federal redistribution saw Hesse allocated an additional constituency. Main-Kinzig – Wetterau II – Schotten was created from parts of the constituencies of  Gießen, Fulda, Wetterau, and Hanau. Its constituency number and borders have not changed since its creation.

Members
The constituency was first represented by Peter Tauber of the Christian Democratic Union (CDU) from 2013 to 2021. It was won by Bettina Müller of the Social Democratic Party (SPD) in 2021.

Election results

2021 election

2017 election

2013 election

References

Federal electoral districts in Hesse
2013 establishments in Germany
Constituencies established in 2013
Main-Kinzig-Kreis
Wetteraukreis
Vogelsbergkreis